Group B of the 2001 Copa América was one of the three groups of competing nations in the 2001 Copa América. It comprised  Brazil, Mexico, Paraguay, and Peru. Group play ran from 12 to 18 July 2001.

Brazil won the group and faced Honduras, the runners-up of Group C, in the quarter-finals. Mexico finished second and faced Chile—the runners-up of Group A—in the quarter-finals. Peru finished third and faced Colombia, the winners of Group A, in the quarter-final. Paraguay finished fourth in the group, and were eliminated from the tournament.

Standings

All times are in local, Colombia Time (UTC−05:00).

Matches

Peru vs Paraguay

Brazil vs Mexico

Brazil vs Peru

Paraguay vs Mexico

Peru vs Mexico

Brazil vs Paraguay

External links
Copa América 2001 at RSSSF

Group B
2001 in Peruvian football
2001 in Paraguayan football
2000–01 in Mexican football
Brazil at the 2001 Copa América